John Lovitt (October 9, 1832 – April 13, 1908) was a Canadian ship’s captain, shipowner, shipbuilder, entrepreneur, and politician.

Early life and education
Born in Yarmouth, Nova Scotia, the eldest son of the John W. Lovitt, Lovitt was educated at the Yarmouth Academy.

Career
A master mariner and shipowner, he was also a director of the Bank of Yarmouth. He represented Yarmouth as a Liberal representative in the Nova Scotia House of Assembly from 1874 to 1878. He held a seat in the House of Commons from 1887 until 1891. He was called to the Senate on the advice of Wilfrid Laurier on March 29, 1897. Sitting for the Liberal Party of Canada he served until his death in 1908.

Personal life
He married Elizabeth Guest in January 1860, they had three sons and five daughters.

Electoral record

References
 
 

1832 births
1908 deaths
Canadian senators from Nova Scotia
Canadian people of Irish descent
Liberal Party of Canada MPs
Liberal Party of Canada senators
Members of the House of Commons of Canada from Nova Scotia
Nova Scotia Liberal Party MLAs
People from Yarmouth, Nova Scotia